Hassan Tampuli (born 1977) is a Ghanaian public administrator, lawyer and energy expert. He is an alumnus of the University of Ghana and the Ghana School of Law. He is a member of the New Patriotic Party. He is currently the head of the National Petroleum Authority (NPA).

Early life and education 
Tampuli was born in 1977 in Gushegu in the Northern Region of Ghana. He graduated from the University of Ghana with a bachelor's degree in business administration. Upon graduation, he was employed as an administrator at the National Service Scheme. He rose to become the Deputy Head of Human Resource and later acted as the Director of Postings.

Tampuli took leave from the service to pursue a law degree from the Faculty of Law at the University of Ghana. After his two years of faculty education, he was admitted to the Ghana School of Law. He was called to the Ghana Bar in 2011. He traveled to the United States to further his legal education in 2013. Tampuli graduated from the Moritz College of Law at Ohio State University with a Master of Laws degree in energy and environmental law.

Career

Legal career
After earning his master's degree, he returned to the National Service Scheme and established the Legal Department in April 2014. He headed the department until 2015, when he resigned from the service to co-found the corporate law firm East-bridge Associates. While at the National Service Scheme, he was a visiting lecturer on constitutional law at the Faculty of Law of the Wisconsin International University College from 2014 to 2015. He resigned from the university in order to engage fully with his private law practice. Hassan worked with the Energy and Natural Resource Practice Group of the law firm Bentsi – Enchill, Letsa & Ankomah as an associate lawyer.

Among Tampuli's legal cases is his advocacy for the release of Lebanese-Ghanaian pilot, journalist, and author Samih Daboussi, who had been detained by the Bureau of National Investigations (BNI) in September 2016 for a period beyond what the Ghanaian constitution allowed. Daboussi had published a book titled 59 years of Ghana to Nowhere: The Future is Now, in which he detailed some activities of functionaries of the National Democratic Congress (NDC) as well as then-president John Dramani Mahama. Some sympathizers of the NDC felt that comments about members of the NDC in the book were offensive and lodged a complaint at the BNI. Daboussi was arrested at Kotoka International Airport upon returning from a trip to Lebanon. His house was searched without warrant by the BNI and copies of his books were seized. The BNI reported that Samih was arrested because his conduct and activities were considered offensive to the president. Tampuli reported that he had been denied access to his client. A social media campaign ensued on Twitter and Facebook using the hashtag #FreeFadiNow seeking the release of Daboussi. Daboussi was released after his bail application was granted.

Political and administrative career 
Tampuli is a member of the New Patriotic Party and has served at various levels of the party's structure. Prior to the 2016 Ghanaian general election, he was a member of the party's manifesto Subcommittee on Energy, and the Transition Subcommittee on Energy. In January 2017, he was appointed as the acting and later substantive head of the National Petroleum Authority. He succeeded Moses Asaga who had served as the head of the authority since 2013.

Honours and awards 
2018 Outstanding Petroleum CEO – 9th Ghana Entrepreneur and Corporate Executive Awards

2018 Special Recognition Award on Leadership - Ghana Oil and Gas Award

Best CEO of the year 2018 – Northern Excellence Awards.

Best Quality Leadership Award - European Society for Quality Research (ESQR) Awards 2018.

Awarded the 2018 Best Quality Leadership Award in Gold category at the ESQR's awards ceremony in Las Vegas, USA in December 2018

Award of Honor 2018 – Oil Trading and Logistics (OTL) Downstream Energy Awards

Outstanding Policy Initiative – Ghana Oil and Gas Awards 2017.

Africa's Downstream Regulator of the Year – Oil Trading and Logistics (OTL) Downstream Energy Awards, 2017.

Outstanding Policy – 2017 Climate and Clean Air Awards. Awarded by the Climate and Clean Air Coalition for implementing the use of low Sulphur fuels in Ghana in July 2017 at Bonn, Germany.

References 

1977 births
Living people
21st-century Ghanaian lawyers
New Patriotic Party politicians
University of Ghana alumni
Ghana School of Law alumni
Ohio State University Moritz College of Law alumni
People from Northern Region (Ghana)